"ROY G BIV BBT" is a song by Alaska Thunderfuck, released in 2021. The song has been described as a "pride anthem".

Background and composition
The song's title refers to ROYGBIV, an acronym for the sequence of hues commonly described as making up a rainbow (red, orange, yellow, green, blue, indigo, and violet), plus the addition of "BBT" to represent black, brown and trans. Alaska Thunderfuck co-wrote the song and said: 

In an interview with High Times, Alaska said of the song and its origins:

Reception
Billboard Stephen Daw said Alaska "pulls out all the stops for a campy, funny, excellent Pride anthem you'll be bumping all the way through June".

References

External links

 

2021 in LGBT history
2021 singles
2021 songs
LGBT-related songs
LGBT pride